Lonely Hearts is a 1991 American thriller film written and directed  by Andrew Lane and starring  Eric Roberts and Beverly D'Angelo.

Plot
A lonely woman who becomes obsessed with a con man. She even poses as his sister to help him trick other women.

falls for the conman who steals her money after seducing her. Frank doesn't want Alma around him, but he cannot do anything about the situation in case she goes to the police. Hot on the trail of the two is a female private detective, working for another of Frank's victims.

Cast 
 
  Eric Roberts as Frank
 Beverly D'Angelo as Alma
 Joanna Cassidy as Erin Randall
 Herta Ware as Gran
 Bibi Besch as Maria Wilson
 Rebecca Street as Jane Ericson
 Miriam Flynn as Helen
 Sharon Farrell as Louise
 Sandy Baron as The Apartment Manager 
 Ellen Geer as Martha
 Marlyn Mason as Beverly Ross 
 Charles Napier as Robby Ross 
 Danny Trejo as The Angry Client

References

External links 

 Lonely Hearts (1991) Cast and Crew

American thriller films
1991 thriller films
1991 films
1990s English-language films
1990s American films